Rafael Crame y Pérez de Tagle (October 2, 1863 - January 1, 1927) was a Filipino Constabulary officer who served as Chief of the former Philippine Constabulary from 1917 until his death in 1927.

Early life and education
Rafael Crame was born in Malabon, Province of Manila (now part of Metro Manila) to Don Rafael María de Crame y González Calderon, an artillery officer in the Spanish Army in the Philippines, while his mother was Maria Perez de Tagle. His grandfather was Joaquín Rafael de Crame (b. 1786) who was Governor-General of the Philippines in 1835.

Crame studied at the Ateneo Municipal de Manila and then enrolled in the Spanish military academy from 1879 up to 1881.

Career
Upon completion of his cadetship, he was employed by the Spanish government in the Negociado de Contribución Territorial. He was a government official in the Administración de Hacienda Pública when the Philippine Revolution broke out in 1896. He served in a battalion consisting of volunteer forces organized by the Spanish armed forces.

Crame joined the Philippine Constabulary in 1902. He was invited to join by a certain Captain Alkinson. Crame started off with the rank of fourth class inspector but gradually rose from the ranks to become a colonel by 1914. In December 1917, Crame was named as chief of the Constabulary and attained the rank of brigadier general.

The American Medal of Valor was awarded to him for helping quash a mutiny in Manila in 1921. He was said to have declined the citation when he said, “I only did my duty."

Recognition
Crame is recognized for being the first Filipino to become chief of the Philippine Constabulary.

On August 7, 2003, 76 years after his death, Crame's remains were exhumed from the La Loma Cemetery in Manila, and he was given a hero's burial at the Libingan ng mga Bayani in Taguig the following day. Camp Crame, the place that houses the Philippine National Police, was named after him due to his contributions to the Philippine Constabulary and for his being a positive role model to the Philippine para-military police force during his time.

References

External links

PNP History

1863 births
1927 deaths
Ateneo de Manila University alumni
Filipino people of Spanish descent
Filipino police officers
People from Malabon
Burials at the Libingan ng mga Bayani
Philippine Constabulary personnel
People of the Philippine Revolution